Honda CBR600 can refer to several Honda middleweight or supersport sport bikes.

Honda CBR600F 
Honda CBR600F2
Honda CBR600F3	
Honda CBR600F4	
Honda CBR600F4i
Honda CBR600F (2011)
Honda CBR650F
Honda CBR650R
Honda CBR600RR

See also 
 Honda CBR series